Alderbrook Winery was a winery in Healdsburg, California, United States. The winery was owned by the Terlato Wine Group and produced upwards of 30,000 cases a year. Their signature wines were Zinfandels using grapes from the Dry Creek Valley AVA.

Founded in 1982, Alderbrook originally focused on white wines. In 1992 the original partners sold the 63-acre ranch to G.W. Gillemont, from Schramsberg Vineyards. In 2001, Terlato Wine Group purchased the majority interest in Alderbrook. As of 2017, the winery was no longer operating.

Wines

Bryan Parker was the winemaker for Alderbrook. Alderbrook's signature wine was but they also used carignane, which is often used as a blending, for wine.

Zinfandel

Zinfandel was the primary varietal used at Alderbrook. They made six different types of Zinfandel, a Zinfandel/Syrah blend, and a port using the grape. All of their zinfandel grapes came from the Dry Creek Valley appellation, including estate and old vine grapes. The winery used 25-30% French oak for the aging process. The low percentage helps to minimize the oak flavors in the finished Zinfandel wine.

References

1982 establishments in California
Healdsburg, California
Wineries in Sonoma County